The 1962 Campeonato Profesional was the 15th season of Colombia's top-flight football league. 12 teams competed against one another. Millonarios won the league for the 7th time in its history, defending successfully the title won in the previous season.

Background
The same 12 teams from the last tournament competed in this one. Millonarios won the championship for the seventh time. The runners-up were Deportivo Cali.

League system
Every team played four games against each other team, two at home and two away. Teams received two points for a win and one point for a draw. If two or more teams were tied on points, places were determined by goal difference. The team with the most points is the champion of the league.

Teams

Final standings

Results

First turn

Second turn

Top goalscorers

Source: RSSSF.com Colombia 1962

References

External links 
Dimayor Official Page

1962 in Colombian football
Colombia
Categoría Primera A seasons